Fairfield is a western suburb of Sydney, in the state of New South Wales, Australia. Fairfield supports a mixture of commercial and residential developments, mostly characterised by medium-density buildings and some new high-rise apartments.

Fairfield is one of the most multicultural and culturally diverse cities in Australia, with more than half of the residents having been born overseas, mostly in non-English speaking countries. The majority of the suburb's dwellers speak a language other than English at home, with the two most common ones being Arabic and Assyrian Neo-Aramaic. Fairfield is an ethnic enclave of Assyrian Christians (mostly from Iraq, and more recently Syria) and other Iraqis of various religious and ethnic origins. Fairfield also is home to a large Latin American presence.

History
For more than 30,000 years, Aboriginal people from the Cabrogal-Gandangara tribe have lived in the Fairfield area.

European settlement, 1780s–1810s
The earliest recorded white settlement in the Fairfield district is described in William Bradley's Journal where he noted an expedition from Rose Hill to Prospect Creek to determine whether Prospect Creek led to Botany Bay. The presence of salt water confirmed Prospect Creek's connection to the sea. Breton Gabriel Louis Marie Huon de Kerrileau, a soldier in the NSW Corps arrived in the colony in 1794, having fled France during the French Revolution. This was an Englished form of the town in which he was born in Brittany, Kastell-Paol, Saint-Pol-de-Léon in French. By 1814 Castel Paul had been combined, by subsequent owners, with several similarly sized grants to form a largely uncleared  estate.

Early development, 1820s–1920s
The free settler John Horsley purchased the estate in that year and named it Mark Lodge, after family properties in Essex, England. Horsley, a Magistrate and Coroner at Liverpool (1825-1834), and his large family were among the pioneers of white settlement in the Fairfield District. Later, a Colonial Treasurer, Thomas Ware Smart (1810–1881) bought the estate and in the 1860s built the mansion, 'Fairfield House'.<ref>The Book of Sydney Suburbs, Compiled by Frances Pollon, Angus & Robertson Publishers, 1990, Published in Australia , page 103</ref> Fairfield railway station was opened in 1856 and has the oldest surviving railway building in New South Wales. Development began in the mid 19th century supported by railway construction in 1856. The railway aided with the enlargement of local industries including timber, fruit development and agricultural produce. Around the start of the 20th century the area had a population of 2,500 people and with fertile soils, produced crops for distribution in Sydney. Electricity was connected in 1921.

Post-war period, 1940s–1980s
Rapid population increase after World War II saw the settlement of many ex-service men and European migrants, with Ware Street becoming the new main street, which featured the city's only escalator. The street at that time featured prominent hardware, furniture, menswear and homeware stores, including a Bing Lee. Large scale Housing Commission development in the 1950s swelled the population to 38,000. The Civic Centre was established in the 1960s in Spencer Street and featured many businesses, including the nearby Civic Hotel. Fairfield Hospital was opened in September 1956 on The Horsley Drive, but was relocated to Prairiewood in 1988.

By 1979, the population had reached 120,000 and the city was becoming one of the larger Local Government Areas in New South Wales. In the early 1980s, Fairfield Forum was opened and Ware Street was shut for traffic, with a pedestrian zone established in its stead with a water fountain imported from Italy being the ornament of the civic area. However, the pedestrian plaza was deemed unsuccessful, despite the annual street parades occurring there, and thus Ware Street once again was open to traffic.

Rapid growth, 1980s–present
During the mid to late 1980s war between Iraq and Iran, large number of Assyrians fled Iraq and settled in Fairfield, making it the most popular settlement for Assyrians. In 1990, Neeta City was opened due to the rapid growth of Fairfield's commercial centre. An amphitheatre situated in Spencer Street with chess board was closed in the early 2000s with the street reopening to traffic. In the mid-2000s, Fairfield's first high rise apartment building (around 9 to 11 storeys) was constructed, with a number of other high rise buildings which were built consequentially throughout the city centre.

In 2015, the Abbott government granted 12,000 extra humanitarian visas to persecuted groups in the war-torn Middle Eastern countries, namely Syria. The Department of Social Services confirmed that 11,400 Iraqi and Syrian refugees (many of whom being Assyrian) were admitted to Australia as part of its one-off humanitarian intake, with half of them primarily settling in Fairfield and also Liverpool. Fairfield City
accommodated 3,000 humanitarian arrivals in 2016, taking in 75% of all western Sydney's refugee intake, with Liverpool City Council second at 14%. Fairfield City Centre today features a concoction of retail, commercial and residential developments, including medium density edifices and medium to high-rise shop-top housing developments.

In July 2021, Fairfield was one of the "suburbs of concern" and became a hotspot due to rising COVID-19 cases in the region that resulted in a strict lockdown in the area, transforming the CBD into a ghost town, with heavy police patrol compliance checks. Fines were issued for those who didn't comply with the state public health order. Workers from Fairfield were ordered to stay at home by NSW premier Gladys Berejiklian unless they had leave the house for emergency reasons or that they had produced a negative COVID-19 test.

Commercial area

Fairfield consists of a combination of main street retail centred in Smart and Ware Streets, arcade and larger shopping centres, with a variety of activities including retail, café/restaurant/take away foods, supermarkets (with some displayed in a bazaar-style environment), personal services and commercial uses. Although most of these commercial precincts are not a leading part of Fairfield's night time attribute at present, wedding receptions, however, do prevail night activity on the weekends. A couple of shop fronts along The Crescent are in the Federation and Art Deco style, which date from the late 1890s to 1920s, respectively, reflecting its former role as an early main street. The CBD is surrounded by a halo of three-storey residential flats, which are beneficial for pedestrian activity to the City Centre. The community holds public gathering and interaction in a high regard, which is manifested by the CBD's active shopping streets and daily social assemblage for playing chess on Kenyon Street.

Fairfield has three shopping malls which were established between the 1980s and early 1990s. The two largest are the Fairfield Forum and Neeta City (later renamed to Fairfield City Central) and the smaller Fairfield Chase. Forum contains Kmart, Aldi and Coles. Fairfield City Central, formerly Neeta City (name changed in late 2021), features a Woolworths supermarket. The Fairfield Chase Commercial Tower was Fairfield's first high-rise structure. It has a lower level of commercial shops, a medical centre & food outlets open to the public while the higher levels function as private office building spaces are occupied by government agencies such as Legal Aid NSW, the NSW Service for Treatment and Rehabilitation of Torture and Trauma Survivors and private companies such as a child care centre and employment agencies. Fairfield doesn't feature a formal ‘City Square’, though The Crescent Plaza, opened to the public in December 2016, and Thomas Ware Plaza in Nelson Street, provide a similar sense of fashion to a City Square. The Crescent, Nelson, Ware and Nelson Streets are ornamented by a number of London planetrees.

Culture

A cinema at Fairfield Forum was opened as 'Hoyts Forum Twin' on 17 March 1983 with around 400 seating. In 1992, the complex was renamed Fairfield Cinema, with a third screen installed in 1996. In 2006, it was reestablished as the World Cinemas (primarily exhibiting Bollywood films). The cinema was altogether closed in 2010 and its site became a fitness/gym centre.

Fairfield's large Iraqi and Assyrian community has had the media describe the suburb as 'Little Iraq' or 'Little Baghdad'. More Iraqi businesses have opened in Fairfield, mostly around Ware Street. These businesses include everything from jewellery shops to restaurants, making the area favourite entertainment and shopping hotspot for the Iraqi and Assyrian community. Fairfield's culturally diverse population is reflected in multicultural local businesses such as over twenty different types of cafés and restaurants that include Assyrian, Iraqi, Italian, Chinese, Lebanese, Vietnamese, South American and Thai cuisine.

Sydney's Iraqi community congregated in Fairfield to celebrate Iraq qualifying for the Asian Football Cup finals in 2007. More than 7000 people joined in street celebrations around Fairfield on Sunday 29 July 2007 after Iraq won the Asian Cup finals. Similar events took place in January 2023 when Iraq won the 25th Arabian Gulf Cup by defeating Oman in the final, 3-2 in extra time with Iraq scoring the winning goal deep into stoppage time of the 2nd half of extra time.

There is a 1,000 sqm public library in Hamilton Road, which was previously located in Kenyon Street. Fairfield has a few Assyrian churches, sporting clubs, cultural associations and health groups.

Heritage

The School of Arts Building, established in the late 19th century, is a social and historical significance and is an example of Victorian and Federation period styles which are uncommon
in the suburb. The Uniting Church is made up of two churches – One of which was built in 1894 and the other in 1927. The first fire brigade built in the city, the Fire Station in William Street, is a free classical style building and is also a historical significance. A federation weatherboard cottage located in Lawson Street was established in around 1910.

Made up of two red brick entrance pillars, Honour Avenue was built in honor of the Fairfield residents who served in the World Wars and it includes the names of World War II personnel. Its connecting metal arch exhibits the words: '1939 Honour Avenue 1945'. The avenue therein contains large brush boxes on both sides and public seating.

Fairfield has a number of heritage-listed sites, including:
 Great Southern railway: Fairfield railway station, Sydney, the oldest Railway Station in New South Wales and one of the oldest groups of buildings in Fairfield City, which are Mid-Victorian, Georgian Style public buildings dating back to 1856.

Media
Fairfield has two local newspapers, The Fairfield Advance and the Fairfield Champion, which are issued every Wednesday.

Transport

Fairfield railway station is on the Inner West & Leppington and Cumberland lines of the Sydney Trains network. Trains run frequently from Fairfield to Leppington, Parramatta and the City Circle. Fairfield also has a major bus interchange adjacent to the railway station. For details of bus services from the interchange see Fairfield railway station. The Horsley Drive is a prominent road in Fairfield, with a high amount of traffic, and acts as a pivotal entrance to the city from the north and southeast. Hamilton Road to the southwest is another.

Schools
Public schools in Fairfield include Fairfield High School and Fairfield Public School. Private Schools include Patrician Brothers' College and Our Lady of the Rosary Primary School, which are both catholic schools. Patrician Brothers' Primary School was also previously located in Fairfield but closed in 2006.

Geography

Much of the original bushland cover within the city has been cleared through past land management practices. A few small areas of this original bushland remain, including examples of Cumberland Plain vegetation and  Cooks River/Castlereagh Ironbark Forest, which are listed under the Threatened Species Conservation Act. The Australian white ibis are specifically present in The Crescent, opposite of the train station.

Eight creeks, 80 kilometres in length, have their headwaters in Fairfield City and flow into the Georges River and Hawkesbury Nepean catchments. The impact of development over the past 50 years has resulted in severe degradation of the natural habitat in the creek banks and water quality has been assessed as very poor in recent years. Strategies are being implemented so that this trend is being reversed. Air quality in the city is heavily impacted upon by an insufficiently integrated public transport system, creating an over reliance upon private vehicles for moving people and freight.

Climate
Fairfield has a humid subtropical climate (Köppen climate classification: Cfa). Summer weather may come from north-east (humid) or the north west (dry). Fairfield is usually a few degrees warmer than Sydney on summer days and a few degrees cooler on winter nights. There could be a temperature differential of 5 degrees Celsius in summer due to sea breezes in the City that don't generally penetrate inland, and in extreme cases there could be a 10 degrees differential. It receives less annual rain than Sydney CBD by about 400mm. Late winter and early spring receive the least rainfall, whilst late summer and autumn receive more rain.

Demographics

According to the 2021 census, the suburb of Fairfield had a population of 18,596 people, the majority of whom (67.3%) were born outside of Australia.

Country of birth
The largest groups were born in Iraq (22.6%), Vietnam (9.8%), Syria (8.3%), China (2.7%) and Cambodia (2.1%).

Languages
Only 16.0% of people spoke English as their only home language. The most common language spoken other than English is Arabic at 16.7% (mostly Iraqi Arabic and Syrian Arabic), Assyrian Neo-Aramaic at 15.2%, Vietnamese at 12.0%, Chaldean Neo-Aramaic at 5.9% and Mandarin at 3.0%. If the Assyrian and Chaldean varieties were combined, then Neo-Aramaic will be the most common language at 21.1%. 

Ethnicity
The most common ethnic groups were Assyrian (15.5%), Vietnamese (11.2%), Chinese (10.2%), Iraqi (10.1%) and Australian (6.9%).

Religion
The top responses for religious affiliation were Catholic (31.1%), No Religion (11.8%), Buddhism (11.7%), and Islam (8.5%). Christianity was the largest religious group reported overall (61.8%).

Families
47.2% were couple families with children, 24.9% were couple families without children and 24.6% were one parent families. Of people over 15 years, 45.5% were married and 13.3% were either divorced or separated. Of all households, 74.4% were family households, 23.1% were single person households and 2.4% were group households.

Dwellings and occupation
Of occupied private dwellings in Fairfield, 40.0% were separate houses, 13.4% were semi-detached or townhouses and 46.0% were apartments. 21.0% of the dwellings were owned and 57.5% were rented.

Politics

Sports and recreationFairfield Adventure Park, a large playground for older children and teens, was opened in April 2015. Nearby is the Fairfield Youth and Community Centre and the Fairfield Leisure Centre, an aquatic centre. These facilities are all situated in Fairfield Park Precinct, a large urban park and sports ground. Prospect Creek winds through it.

Fairfield is also the home suburb of the Fairfield Bulls and Fenix FCS football clubs.The Crescent Park is adjacent to the station, which features public seating surrounded by native and exotic plants. Another green space in the city is the David Carty Reserve'', which is a small, round islet, surrounded by Fairfield Street and The Horsley Drive, that features a number of prominent Hill's weeping figs, and camphor trees – which are introduced evergreens native to East Asia.

Notable people
 Mark Bosnich, Australian Socceroos player
 Mitchell Claydon, Australian-English cricketer
 Jelena Dokić, Australian tennis player
 Jon English, singer, songwriter, musician and actor
 Blake Green, Australian rugby league player 
 Glenn Grief, Australian rugby league player
 Les Hill, Australian actor
 Justice Crew, winners of Australia's Got Talent in 2010
 Harry Kewell, Australian Socceroos player
 David Klemmer, Australian rugby league player
 Bing Lee, Founder of the Bing Lee enterprise
Michael Masi, Formula One race director
 Bill Summerell, Australian rugby league player
 Donnie Sutherland, Journalist and television host 
 Maria Tran, filmmaker, Artist-in-residence Powerhouse Youth Theatre 2018
 Kyle White, Australian rugby league player 
 Gough Whitlam, 21st Prime Minister of Australia (1972 to 1975)
 Ruben Zadkovich, Newcastle Jets and Australian Socceroos player

See also
 Fairfield Hospital (Sydney)

References

External links

 Fairfield City Council Official Site
 2001 Census Information.
 Fairfield Advance Local Newspaper
 Fairfield Champion Newspaper

Suburbs of Sydney
Populated places established in 1807
Cumberland Council, New South Wales
City of Fairfield